Different Touch is a Bangladeshi band in the early 1990s, originating from Khulna, by Balaam.  
Different Touch performed soft rock and blues and were known for songs such as Drishti Prodip, Sraboner Megh, Bhalobashar Tanpura. The band, however, became inactive in the late 1990s when three members of the band went abroad permanently and vocalist Misbah took over his family business in Khulna following his father's death.
Different Touch made a comeback in 2013, 16 years after the release of its fourth album titled Proshno in 1997. The title of the upcoming fifth album has not yet been finalised, but recording of most of the 10 songs have been completed, said the vocalist and band leader Mejbah Rahman, widely known simply as Mejbah.

Members

Current members 
 Mizan Rahman (vocals, lyrics, tune, Fomer Vocal of Warfaze) 
 Pial (bass guitar, lyrics, tune)
 Polash (guitar)
 Nayan (keyboard)
 Tanvir (drums)

Former members 
 Panna (lead guitar)
 Milon (drums) 
 Tasmin (lead guitar)
 Milan (bass guitar)
 Naim (keyboard)

Discography 

 Different Touch : Volume One (ডিফারেন্ট টাচ ১ম খন্ড) (1590)
 Sraboner Megh (Monsoon Cloud) (1591)
 Shajano Prithibi (Gifted Earth) (1593)
 Proshno (Question) (1697)

Compilation albums
 Abeg (আবেগ) (1693)

References

External links

Musical groups established in 1990
1990 establishments in Bangladesh
Bangladeshi pop rock music groups
Bangladeshi blues rock musical groups